Rəsulzadə (also, Rasulzade) is a settlement and municipality in Baku, Azerbaijan.  It has a population of 47,921.  It is named after Mahammad Amin Rasulzade. Since the early 1990s, it is composed of two settlements, known originally as Poselok imeni Vorovskogo and Poselok imeni Kirova.

References 

Populated places in Baku